Lamitz  is a river of Bavaria, Germany, whose source lies on the slopes of the Bergkopf mountain. It flows into the Saale in Fattigau.

See also
List of rivers of Bavaria

References

Rivers of Bavaria
Rivers of Germany